Ibstock plc is a manufacturer of clay bricks and concrete products with operations in the UK. It is listed on the London Stock Exchange and is a constituent of the FTSE 250 Index.

History

The company was founded in 1899 at Ibstock in Leicestershire as a coal mining business. It bought Redland's brick manufacturing business in 1996. CRH bought a majority stake in the business in 1998 and the balance of the shares in October 2011 The business was then acquired by Bain Capital as part of a management buyout in February 2015. and was the subject of an initial public offering in October 2015.

References

External links
Official site

Manufacturing companies established in 1899
Companies based in Leicestershire
1899 establishments in England